Semen Aleksandrovich Pavlichenko (born 11 May 1991) is a Russian luger. He competed at the 2014 Winter Olympics

World Cup podiums

Season titles
 1 titles – (1 singles)

Personal life
At the beginning of Russia's invasion of Ukraine in late February and early march 2022, Pavlichenko participated in spreading lies and Russian propaganda on social media to justify the illegal war.

References

External links

1991 births
Living people
People from Bratsk
Russian male lugers
Lugers at the 2014 Winter Olympics
Lugers at the 2018 Winter Olympics
Lugers at the 2022 Winter Olympics
Olympic lugers of Russia
Sportspeople from Irkutsk Oblast